This is a table of specific heat capacities by magnitude. Unless otherwise noted, these values assume standard ambient temperature and pressure.

Specific Heat Capacity